Kimberly John Young (born March 20, 1951) is a Canadian politician. He served in the Legislative Assembly of Saskatchewan from 1982 to 1986, as a Progressive Conservative member for the constituency of Saskatoon Eastview.

References

Progressive Conservative Party of Saskatchewan MLAs
1951 births
Living people